Palmar arches (or Volar arches) may refer to:
 Deep palmar arch
 Superficial palmar arch
 Palmar carpal arch
There is also a ligamentous arch:
 Ligamentous palmar arch